Ion Nicolaescu (born 7 September 1998) is a Moldovan professional footballer who plays as a forward for Israeli Premier League club Beitar Jerusalem and the Moldova national team.

Career
On 20 May 2016, Nicolaescu made his professional debut for Zimbru Chișinău in the Divizia Națională against Academia Chișinău, coming on as a 65th-minute substitute.

DAC Dunajská Streda
Nicolaescu joined DAC Dunajská Streda of Fortuna Liga in September 2020. After mere two days with the club he contributed with two goals to a 5–3 victory over Jablonec, advancing the Slovak side to the Third Round of UEFA Europa League qualifying.

International goals
Scores and results list Moldova's goal tally first.

Notes

References

External links

1998 births
Living people
Moldovan footballers
Moldovan expatriate footballers
Moldova youth international footballers
Moldova under-21 international footballers
Moldova international footballers
Association football forwards
FC Zimbru Chișinău players
FC Shakhtyor Soligorsk players
FC Vitebsk players
FC DAC 1904 Dunajská Streda players
Maccabi Petah Tikva F.C. players
Beitar Jerusalem F.C. players
Moldovan Super Liga players
Belarusian Premier League players
Slovak Super Liga players
Israeli Premier League players
Expatriate footballers in Belarus
Expatriate footballers in Slovakia
Expatriate footballers in Israel
Moldovan expatriate sportspeople in Belarus
Moldovan expatriate sportspeople in Slovakia
Moldovan expatriate sportspeople in Israel